The British Society for the History of Science (BSHS) was founded in 1947 by Francis Butler, Joan Eyles and Victor Eyles.

Overview
It is Britain's largest learned society devoted to the history of science, technology, and medicine. The society's aim is to bring together people with interests in all aspects of the field, and to publicise relevant ideas within the wider research and teaching communities and the media. Its mission statement states the society will strive "to foster the understanding of the history and social impact of science, technology and medicine in all their branches in the academic and the wider communities, and to provide a national focus for the discipline."

Publications are a key feature of the society's professional activity. Print publications include:
The British Journal for the History of Science (BJHS): a peer-reviewed quarterly academic journal, including articles and reviews of the latest books in the history of science, technology and medicine
BJHS Themes: a peer-reviewed open access academic journal, an annual themed collection of articles
Viewpoint: magazine of the society, published three times a year and featuring news and views from across the field
BSHS Monographs: work of lasting scholarly value that might not otherwise be made available, and aids the dissemination of innovative projects advancing scholarship or education in the field
Other publications are online, including the BSHS List of Theses, and the BSHS Guide to Institutions.

The society also awards several prizes:
The Singer Prize, awarded every two years for an unpublished research essay by new scholars
The BSHS Hughes Prize, awarded every two years to the best history of science book written for a popular audience
The BSHS Slade Prize, awarded between 1999 and 2009 for studies of conceptual innovation or scientific methodology
The BSHS John Pickstone Prize, awarded every two years to the best scholarly history of science book written in English

Wikipedia
The society hosted an editathon at their annual conference in July 2015 at Swansea, which included wiki-skills training, and which resulted in better content on British scientists on Wikipedia.

References

External links 

Organizations established in 1947
Learned societies of the United Kingdom
History of science organizations
1947 establishments in the United Kingdom